Pignus is a genus of African jumping spiders that was first described by Wanda Wesołowska in 2000.  it contains only three species, found only in Africa: P. lautissimum, P. pongola, and P. simoni.

References

Salticidae genera
Salticidae
Spiders of Africa
Taxa named by Wanda Wesołowska